Mario Siciliano (1925–1987) was an Italian film director, screenwriter and producer.

In 1962 he founded Metheus Film.

He directed more than twenty films from 1969 to 1984. He often used the names Marlon Sirko, Lee Castle, and Luca Delli Azzer.

Selected filmography

References

External links 

1925 births
1987 deaths
Italian film directors
20th-century Italian screenwriters
Italian male screenwriters
Italian film producers
20th-century Italian male writers